The Ngaliwurru  are an indigenous Australian people of the Northern Territory.

Language
Ngaliwurru is closely related to Jaminjung, two of the three languages of the Yirram branch of the non Pama-Nyungan languages.

Country
It also included Timber Creek and the treeless plateau terrain westwards beyond Limbunya, Waterloo and the West Baines River. In relatively modern times, the Ngaliwurru moving southwards took over the traditional lands of the former Tjial people.

Alternative name
 Ngaliwerun

Notes

Citations

Sources

Aboriginal peoples of the Northern Territory